Prince Cuckoo is a 1919 German silent drama film directed by Paul Leni and starring Conrad Veidt, Olga Limburg, and Magnus Stifter. It premiered at the Marmorhaus. It is now considered a lost film.

It was shot at the Babelsberg Studios in Berlin. The film's sets were designed by the art directors Karl Machus and Otto Moldenhauer along with Leni.

Cast

References

Bibliography

External links

1919 films
Films of the Weimar Republic
German silent feature films
Films directed by Paul Leni
German drama films
1919 drama films
German black-and-white films
Lost German films
Films shot at Babelsberg Studios
Silent drama films
1910s German films
1910s German-language films